Acrocercops alysidota (wattle miner) is a moth of the family Gracillariidae. It is known from New South Wales, Queensland, Victoria, Southern Australia and Western Australia as well as New Zealand.

The wingspan is about 8 mm. Adults have a fringe along the trailing edge of each wing. The forewings have light and dark chevron markings, while the hindwings are golden brown.

The larvae feed on Acacia longifolia, Acacia melanoxylon, Acacia pycnantha and Acacia saligna. They mine the leaves of their host plant. The mine consists of a long, narrow gallery on either side of the leaf. It is more or less tortuous in direction, and generally up and down the long axis of the leaf. The colour of the early part of the mine is white, with a thin brown or black central line of frass. Later, it becomes a somewhat lighter green than the rest of the leaf-surface. This portion of the mine is loosely packed with fine frass granules. The cuticle over old mines rapidly dies and becomes brown. Badly infected leaves wither and fall from the tree. The final inch or so of the mine is often expanded into a somewhat irregular, narrow, elongated blotch.

References

External links
 The Leaf Mining Insects of New Zealand

alysidota
Moths of Australia
Moths of New Zealand
Moths described in 1880